Erechthias diaphora is a moth of the family Tineidae. It is known from Australia, including New South Wales, Queensland and Victoria.

Adults dark brown forewings with pale bands along the margins.

The larvae live in a silken case covered in frass. They have been recorded hiding underneath loose bark on wattles and gum trees.

References

Erechthiinae
Insects of Australia
Moths described in 1893